Golden Broadcast Professionals, Inc., is a broadcasting company based in Zamboanga City. It operates a radio and TV station affiliated with Quest Broadcasting Inc. and TV5 Network, Inc. The network was formerly affiliated with Intercontinental Broadcasting Corporation (DXZB-TV 13) and Radio Mindanao Network (DXRZ-TV CTV 31).

History
The radio (DXEL-FM) and television station (DXGB-TV) were launched in August 1992 at its broadcasting hub located at Campaner St., Zamboanga City. The station originally affiliated with TV5 Network, Inc. (DXGB TV11) from November 1, 1992 – December 31, 1997, and 2004 to present. Its FM station, formerly known as 95.5 Gold FM, is an affiliate of Quest Broadcasting Inc., the network that brought Magic 89.9 in Manila and Killer Bee FM Stations to the Philippine airwaves, from May 1, 2000.

Affiliations
TV5 Network, Inc. (TV5) - November 1, 1992 – January 1, 1998; Mid-2004 to present
Intercontinental Broadcasting Corporation (IBC 13) - November 1, 1998 to late 2005.
BEAM (RMN) - April to October 1998 to late July 2011.
 One Sports - Mid-2004 to present

Programs

Current Programs
Dateline TeleRadyo (Morning Edition) - A three-hour television and radio news live programming, through GBPI TV11 and Magic 95.5 from 6 to 9 AM. Hosted by Ronnie Lledo and JV Francisco
Dateline TeleRadyo (Afternoon Edition) - A continuation for their morning block and simulcast as well through GBPI TV11 and Magic 95.5 from 6 to 9 AM. Hosted by JV Francisco
Frontline Chavacano - the flagship Chavacano newscast anchored by Noning Antonio.
No Holds Barred - talkshow hosted by Ronnie Lledo (replacing "No Limit")
BENG - talkshow program hosted by Zamboanga City Mayor Maria Isabelle Climaco

Previous Programs
Dateline Zamboanga (English Broadcast) - Originally aired in English since 1993, it reformatted in local Chavacano language in 2001.
Celso desde Limpapa hasta Licomo - Started in 1998, it aired during the first term as a Congressman of Cong. Celso Lobregat. The show ended when he was elected as the city mayor in 2004.
30 Minutes with Atty. Vic Solis - a 30-minute current affairs program by Atty. Vic Solis. It ended in 2008.
S na S! - produced by Rikki Lim of Victory Studio, Zamboanga City
Yahoo! - variety show hosted and produced by former City Councilor VP Elago
Amor con Amor Se Paga - a public affairs programming hosted by the former Zamboanga City 2nd District Cong. Erbie Fabian. The show ended when Cong. Fabian ended his 3-year term as congressman.
VEZ TV (Vale el Zamboanga) - local tele-magazine in cooperation with SkyCable Zamboanga. They transferred to EMedia Productions in early 2016.

Aside from these said programs and most of TV5's network programming, the station also airs blocktime movie programs as well as live telecast of local issues affecting Zamboanga.

GBPI Radio station
 
-Affiliated with Quest Broadcasting Inc.

GBPI TV station

Analog

Digital
 
-With several cable affiliates in Zamboanga Peninsula.

One Sports station

See also 
TV5 Network, Inc.
Intercontinental Broadcasting Corporation
List of television and radio stations in Zamboanga City
Quest Broadcasting Inc.
EMedia Productions

TV5 Network
Television networks in the Philippines
Philippine radio networks
Television stations in the Philippines
Radio stations in the Philippines
Mass media companies established in 1992
Mass media companies of the Philippines